Hoppin is a surname. Notable people with the surname include:

Augustus Hoppin (1828–1896), American book illustrator
Courtland Hector Hoppin (1906–1974), American artist
Howard Hoppin (1856–1940), American architect
James Mason Hoppin (1820-1906), American educator and writer
Richard Hoppin (1913-1991), American musicologist